The 1967–68 daytime network television schedule for the three major English-language commercial broadcast networks in the United States covers the weekday and weekend daytime hours from September 1967 to August 1968.

Talk shows are highlighted in  yellow, local programming is white, reruns of older programming are orange, game shows are pink, soap operas are chartreuse, news programs are gold, children's programs are light purple and sports programs are light blue. New series are highlighted in bold.

Note: This is the first full season in which all the three networks broadcast most of their weekday schedules in color.

Note: Please refer to the discussion page before attempting to edit.

Monday-Friday

Note: On CBS, both Search for Tomorrow and Guiding Light expanded from 15 to 30 minutes on Monday September 9, 1968. They were the last two 15-minute soap operas airing on television, ending a 22-season era of 15 minute soap operas which had begun with the first ever soap opera on television, Faraway Hill, on the DuMont network in 1946. As a result of those expansions, (The) Guiding Light was moved to 2:30 PM resulting in Art Linkletter's House Party in being pushed forward to 4:00 PM. The Edge of Night and The Secret Storm were also moved to 3:00 and 3:30 PM for respectively. As a result of this scheduling shuffle the program at CBS, To Tell The Truth aired its last broadcast on Friday September 6, 1968. Otherwise, the remainder stayed as is.

Saturday

Sunday

By network

ABC

Returning series:
ABC News
The Beagles  (moved from CBS)
The Bullwinkle Show
The Children's Doctor
The Dating Game
Dateline:Hollywood
Discovery
The Donna Reed Show 
Dream Girl of '67
Everybody's Talking
The Family Game
The Fugitive 
General Hospital
The Honeymoon Race
Issues and Answers
Let's Make a Deal
Linus the Lionhearted
The Magilla Gorilla Show
It's Happening
The Milton the Monster Show
The New American Bandstand 1968
The New Beatles 
The New Casper Cartoon Show
The Newlywed Game
News with the Woman's Touch
Peter Jennings with the News
The Peter Potamus Show 

New series:
The Baby Game
Bewitched 
Dark Shadows
The Dick Cavett Show
Dream House
Fantastic Four
George of the Jungle
Happening '68
How's Your Mother-In-Law?
Journey to the Center of the Earth
One Life to Live
Spider-Man
Temptation
This Morning with Dick Cavett
Treasure Isle
Wedding Party

Not returning from 1966-67:
Beany and Cecil 
Ben Casey 
The Bugs Bunny Show 
Father Knows Best 
The Honeymoon Race
Hoppity Hooper
The Nurses
One in a Million
The Porky Pig Show 
Supermarket Sweep
A Time for Us
Where the Action Is

CBS

Returning series:
Andy of Mayberry 
Art Linkletter's House Party
As the World Turns
The Beverly Hillbillies 
Camera Three
Captain Kangaroo
CBS Evening News
CBS Morning News
CBS News
The Dick Van Dyke Show 
The Edge of Night
Face the Nation
Frankenstein, Jr. and The Impossibles
The Guiding Light
Jonny Quest 
Lamp Unto My Feet
The Linkletter Show
The Lone Ranger
Look Up and Live
Love of Life
The NFL Today
The Road Runner Show
Search for Tomorrow
The Secret Storm
Shazzan
Space Ghost and Dino Boy
Sunrise Semester
The Superman/Aquaman Hour of Adventure
Ted Mack's Amateur Hour
To Tell the Truth
Tom and Jerry
Underdog
Where the Heart Is

New series
The Herculoids 
Love is a Many Splendored Thing
Moby Dick and Mighty Mightor
Shazzan

Not returning from 1966-67:
Candid Camera 
Mighty Mouse & The Mighty Heroes
Password 
The Beagles (moved to ABC)

NBC

Returning series
Another World
Another World in Bay City
The Atom Ant/Secret Squirrel Show
Concentration
Cool McCool
Days of Our Lives
The Doctors
Eye Guess
The Flintstones 
The Frank McGee Report
Frontiers of Faith
Hidden Faces
The Hollywood Squares
Jeopardy!
Let's Make a Deal
The Match Game
Meet the Press
NBC News
NBC Saturday Night News
NBC Sunday Night News
Personality
Snap Judgment
  The Super 6
Today
Top Cat 
You Don't Say!
Young Samson

New series
Animal World
Birdman and the Galaxy Trio
Samson & Goliath
Super President and Spy Shadow

Not returning from 1966-67:
Animal Secrets
The Bell Telephone Hour / Actuality Specials
The Jetsons 
The Smithsonian
The Space Kidettes

See also
1967-68 United States network television schedule (prime-time)
1967-68 United States network television schedule (late night)

Sources
Hyatt, Wesley, The Encyclopedia Of Daytime Television. New York: Billboard Books, 1997.

United States weekday network television schedules
1967 in American television
1968 in American television